Megachile chilensis is a species of bee in the family Megachilidae. It was described by Spinola in 1851.

References

Chilensis
Insects described in 1851